The Jaynes–Cummings model (sometimes abbreviated JCM) is a theoretical model in quantum optics. It describes the system of a two-level atom interacting with a quantized mode of an optical cavity (or a bosonic field), with or without the presence of light (in the form of a bath of electromagnetic radiation that can cause spontaneous emission and absorption).  It was originally developed to study the interaction of atoms with the quantized electromagnetic field in order to investigate the phenomena of spontaneous emission and absorption of photons in a cavity.

The Jaynes–Cummings model is of great interest to atomic physics, quantum optics, solid-state physics and quantum information circuits, both experimentally and theoretically. It also has applications in coherent control and quantum information processing.

Historical development

1963: Edwin Jaynes & Fred Cummings 
The model was originally developed in a 1963 article by Edwin Jaynes and Fred Cummings to elucidate the effects of giving a fully quantum mechanical treatment to the behavior of atoms interacting with an electromagnetic field. In order to simplify the math and allow for a tractable calculation, Jaynes and Cummings restricted their attention to the interaction of an atom with a single mode of quantum electromagnetic field. (See below for further mathematical details.)

This approach is in contrast to the earlier semi-classical method, in which only the dynamics of the atom are treated quantum mechanically, while the field with which it interacts is assumed to behave according to classical electromagnetic theory. The quantum mechanical treatment of the field in the Jaynes–Cummings model reveals a number of novel features, including:

The existence of Rabi oscillations between the states of the two-level system as it interacts with the quantum field. This was originally believed to be a purely quantum mechanical effect, although a semi-classical explanation for it was later provided in terms of linear dispersion and absorption
A ladder of quantized energy levels, called the Jaynes-Cummings ladder, that scales in energy non-linearly as  where  is the total number of quanta in the coupled system. This quantization of energies and non-linear scaling is purely quantum mechanical in nature.
The collapse and subsequent revivals of the probability to detect the two-level system in a given state when the field is initially in a coherent state. While the collapse has a simple classical explanation, the revivals can only be explained by the discreteness of the energy spectrum due to quantum nature of the field.

To realize the dynamics predicted by the Jaynes–Cummings model experimentally requires a quantum mechanical resonator with a very high quality factor so that the transitions between the states in the two-level system (typically two energy sub-levels in an atom) are coupled very strongly by the interaction of the atom with the field mode. This simultaneously suppresses any coupling between other sub-levels in atom and coupling to other modes of the field, and thus makes any losses small enough to observe the dynamics predicted by the Jaynes–Cummings model. Because of the difficulty in realizing such an apparatus, the model remained a mathematical curiosity for quite some time. In 1985, several groups using Rydberg atoms along with a maser in a microwave cavity demonstrated the predicted Rabi oscillations. However, as noted before, this effect was later found to have a semi-classical explanation.

1987: Rempe, Walther & Klein 
It was not until 1987 that Rempe, Walther, & Klein were finally able to use a single-atom maser to demonstrate the revivals of probabilities predicted by the model. Before that time, research groups were unable to build experimental setups capable of enhancing the coupling of an atom with a single field mode, simultaneously suppressing other modes. Experimentally, the quality factor of the cavity must be high enough to consider the dynamics of the system as equivalent to the dynamics of a single mode field. This successful demonstration of dynamics that could only be explained by a quantum mechanical model of the field spurred further development of high quality cavities for use in this research.

With the advent of one-atom masers it was possible to study the interaction of a single atom (usually a Rydberg atom) with a single resonant mode of the electromagnetic field in a cavity from an experimental point of view, and study different aspects of the Jaynes–Cummings model.

It was found that an hourglass geometry could be used to maximize the volume occupied by the mode, while simultaneously maintaining a high quality factor in order to maximize coupling strength, and thus better approximate the parameters of the model. To observe strong atom-field coupling in visible light frequencies, hour-glass-type optical modes can be helpful because of their large mode volume that eventually coincides with a strong field inside the cavity. A quantum dot inside a photonic crystal nano-cavity is also a promising system for observing collapse and revival of Rabi cycles in the visible light frequencies.

Further developments
Many recent experiments have focused on the application of the model to systems with potential applications in quantum information processing and coherent control.
Various experiments have demonstrated the dynamics of the Jaynes–Cummings model in the coupling of a quantum dot to the modes of a micro-cavity, potentially allowing it to be applied in a physical system of much smaller size. Other experiments have focused on demonstrating the non-linear nature of the Jaynes-Cummings ladder of energy levels by direct spectroscopic observation. These experiments have found direct evidence for the non-linear behavior predicted from the quantum nature of the field in both superconducting circuits containing an "artificial atom" coupled to a very high quality oscillator in the form of a superconducting RLC circuit, and in a collection of Rydberg atoms coupled via their spins. In the latter case, the presence or absence of a collective Rydberg excitation in the ensemble serves the role of the two level system, while the role of the bosonic field mode is played by the total number of spin flips that take place.

Theoretical work has extended the original model to include the effects of dissipation and damping, typically via a phenomenological approach. Proposed extensions have also incorporated the inclusion of multiple modes of the quantum field, allowing for coupling to additional energy levels within the atom, or the presence of multiple atoms interacting with the same field. Some attempt has also been made to go beyond the so-called rotating-wave approximation that is usually employed (see the mathematical derivation below). The coupling of a single quantum field mode with multiple two-state subsystems (equivalent to spins higher than 1/2) is known as the Dicke model or the Tavis–Cummings model. For example, it applies to a high quality resonant cavity containing multiple identical atoms with transitions near the cavity resonance, or a resonator coupled to multiple quantum dots on a superconducting circuit. It reduces to the Jaynes–Cummings model for the case .

The model provides the possibility to realize several exotic theoretical possibilities in an experimental setting. For example, it was realized that during the periods of collapsed Rabi oscillations, the atom-cavity system exists in a quantum superposition state on a macroscopic scale. Such a state is sometimes referred to as a "Schrödinger cat", since it allows the exploration of the counter intuitive effects of how quantum entanglement manifests in macroscopic systems. It can also be used to model how quantum information is transferred in a quantum field.

Mathematical formulation 1 

The Hamiltonian that describes the full system,

consists of the free field Hamiltonian, the atomic excitation Hamiltonian, and the Jaynes–Cummings interaction Hamiltonian:

For deriving the JCM interaction Hamiltonian the quantized radiation field is taken to consist of a single bosonic mode with the field operator
On the other hand, the two-level atom is equivalent to a spin-half whose state can be described using a three-dimensional Bloch vector. (It should be understood that "two-level atom" here is not an actual atom with spin, but rather a generic two-level quantum system whose Hilbert space is isomorphic to a spin-half.) The atom is coupled to the field through its polarization operator .

Jaynes–Cummings Hamiltonian 1 

Moving from the Schrödinger picture into the interaction picture (a.k.a. rotating frame) defined by the choice
,
we obtain

This Hamiltonian contains both quickly  and slowly  oscillating components. To get a solvable model, the quickly oscillating "counter-rotating" terms, are ignored. This is referred to as the rotating wave approximation, and it is valid since the fast oscillating term couples states of comparatively large energy difference:
When the difference in energy is much larger than the coupling, the mixing of these states will be small, or put differently, the coupling is responsible for very little population transfer between the states. Transforming back into the Schrödinger picture the JCM Hamiltonian is thus written as

Eigenstates 

It is possible, and often very helpful, to write the Hamiltonian of the full system as a sum of two commuting parts:

where

with  called the detuning (frequency) between the field and the two-level system.

where  is the Rabi frequency for the specific detuning parameter.  The eigenstates  associated with the energy eigenvalues are given by

where the angle  is defined through

Schrödinger picture dynamics 

It is now possible to obtain the dynamics of a general state by expanding it on to the noted eigenstates. We consider a superposition of number states as the initial state for the field, and assume an atom in the excited state is injected into the field. The initial state of the system is

 is just given by

The Rabi oscillations can readily be seen in the sin and cos functions in the state vector. Different periods occur for different number states of photons.
What is observed in experiment is the sum of many periodic functions that can be very widely oscillating and destructively sum to zero at some moment of time, but will be non-zero again at later moments. Finiteness of this moment results just from discreteness of the periodicity arguments. If the field amplitude were continuous, the revival would have never happened at finite time.

Heisenberg picture dynamics 

It is possible in the Heisenberg notation to directly determine the unitary evolution operator from the Hamiltonian:

where the operator  is defined as

and their Hermitian conjugates.

By the unitary evolution operator one can calculate the time evolution of the state of the system described by its density matrix , and from there the expectation value of any observable, given the initial state:

Mathematical formulation 2

For ease of illustration, consider the interaction of two energy sub-levels of an atom with a quantized electromagnetic field. The behavior of any other two-state system coupled to a bosonic field will be isomorphic to these dynamics. In that case, the Hamiltonian for the atom-field system is:

Where we have made the following definitions:
 is the Hamiltonian of the atom, where the letters  are used to denote the excited and ground state respectively. Setting the zero of energy to the ground state energy of the atom simplifies this to  where  is the resonance frequency of transitions between the sub-levels of the atom.
 is the Hamiltonian of the quantized electromagnetic field. Note the infinite sum over all possible wave-vectors  and two possible orthogonal polarization states . The simplicity of the Jaynes–Cummings model comes from suppressing this general sum by considering only a single mode of the field, allowing us to write  where the subscript  indicates that we are considering only the resonant mode of the cavity.
 is the dipole atom-field interaction Hamiltonian (here  is the position of the atom). The application of the Jaynes-Cummings model allows suppression of this sum, and restrict the attention to a single mode of the field. Thus the atom-field Hamiltonian becomes: .

Rotating frame and rotating-wave approximation

Next, the analysis may be simplified by performing a passive transformation into the so-called "co-rotating" frame. To do this, we use the interaction picture. Take 
. Then the interaction Hamiltonian becomes:

We now assume that the resonance frequency of the cavity is near the transition frequency of the atom, that is, we assume . In the time  that it takes for the resonant terms to complete one full oscillation, the anti-resonant terms will complete many full cycles. Since over each full cycle  of anti-resonant oscillation, the net effect of the quickly oscillating anti-resonant terms tends to average to 0 for the timescales over which we wish to analyze resonant behavior. We may thus neglect the anti-resonant terms altogether, since their value is negligible compared to that of the nearly resonant terms. This approximation is known as the rotating wave approximation, and it accords with the intuition that energy must be conserved. Then the interaction Hamiltonian (taking  to be real for simplicity) is:

With this approximation in hand (and absorbing the negative sign into ), we may transform back to the Schrödinger picture:

Jaynes-Cummings Hamiltonian 2
Using the results gathered in the last two sections, we may now write down the full Jaynes-Cummings Hamiltonian: 

The constant term  represents the zero-point energy of the field. It will not contribute to the dynamics, so it may be neglected, giving:

Next, define the so-called number operator by:
.
Consider the commutator of this operator with the atom-field Hamiltonian:

Thus the number operator commutes with the atom-field Hamiltonian. The eigenstates of the number operator are the basis of tensor product states
 where the states  of the field are the those with a definite number  of photons. The number operator  counts the total number  of quanta in the atom-field system.

With the exception of the scalar , each  on the diagonal is itself a  matrix of the form;

Now, using the relation:

We obtain the portion of the Hamiltonian that acts in the nth subspace as:

We have also defined the operators:

to be the identity operator and Pauli x and z operators in the Hilbert space of the nth energy level of the atom-field system. This simple  Hamiltonian is of the same form as what would be found in the Rabi problem. Diagonalization gives the energy eigenvalues and eigenstates to be:

Where the angle  is defined by the relation .

Vacuum Rabi oscillations
Consider an atom entering the cavity initially in its excited state, while the cavity is initially in the vacuum state. Then the state of the atom-field system as a function of time is:

So the probabilities to find the system in the ground or excited states after interacting with the cavity for a time  are:

Thus the probability amplitude to find the atom in either state oscillates. This is the quantum mechanical explanation for the phenomenon of vacuum Rabi oscillation. In this case, there was only a single quantum in the atom-field system, carried in by the initially excited atom. In general, the Rabi oscillation associated with an atom-field system of  quanta will have frequency . As explained below, this discrete spectrum of frequencies is the underlying reason for the collapses and subsequent revivals probabilities in the model.

Jaynes-Cummings ladder

This change in eigenstates due to the alteration of the Hamiltonian caused by the atom-field interaction is sometimes called "dressing" the atom, and the new eigenstates are referred to as the dressed states.
The energy difference between the dressed states is:

Of particular interest is the case where the cavity frequency is perfectly resonant with the transition frequency of the atom, so .
In the resonant case, the dressed states are:

With energy difference . This non-linear splitting effect is purely quantum mechanical, and cannot be explained by any semi-classical model.

Collapse and revival of probabilities
Consider an atom initially in the ground state interacting with a field mode initially prepared in a coherent state, so the initial state of the atom-field system is:

For simplicity, take the resonant case, then the Hamiltonian for the nth number subspace is:

Using this, the time evolution of the atom-field system will be:

Note neither of the constant factors  nor  contribute to the dynamics beyond an overall phase, since they represent the zero-point energy. In this case, the probability to find the atom having flipped to the excited state at a later time  is:

Where we have identified  to be the mean photon number in a coherent state.

Inserting this into the sum yields a complicated product of exponentials: 

For "small" times such that , the inner exponential inside the double exponential in the last term can be expanded up second order to obtain:

This result shows that the probability of occupation of the excited state oscillates with effective frequency . It also shows that it should decay over characteristic time:

The collapse can be easily understood as a consequence of destructive interference between the different frequency components as they de-phase and begin to destructively interfere over time. However, the fact that the frequencies have a discrete spectrum leads to another interesting result in the longer time regime; in that case, the periodic nature of the slowly varying double exponential predicts that there should also be a revival of probability at time:

The revival of probability is due to the re-phasing of the various discrete frequencies. If the field were classical, the frequencies would have a continuous spectrum, and such re-phasing could never occur within a finite time.

A plot of the probability to find an atom initially in the ground state to have transitioned to the excited state after interacting with a cavity prepared a in a coherent state vs. the unit-less parameter  is shown to the right. Note the initial collapse followed by the clear revival at longer times.

Collapses and revivals of quantum oscillations 

This plot of quantum oscillations of atomic inversion—for quadratic scaled detuning parameter , where  is the detuning parameter—was built on the basis of formulas obtained by A.A. Karatsuba and E.A. Karatsuba.

See also
Caldeira–Leggett model
Jaynes–Cummings–Hubbard model
Rabi problem
Spontaneous emission
Vacuum Rabi oscillation

References

Further reading 

Quantum optics